The 2014-15 season was the Dynamos 18th season of operation.

On 23 July 2014, the EIHA announced a new cup competition, the English Challenge Cup. This tournament will see the Dynamos play Basingstoke Bison, Bracknell Bees, Guildford Flames, Milton Keynes Lightning and Swindon Wildcats from the EPIHL, as well as Chelmsford Chieftains and Wightlink Raiders from the NIHL South Division 1.

Roster moves

In
 11 June 2014 - Former Team GB player, Greg Chambers, joined the team and will take up an Import slot as well as a player-coach role after signing from Sheffield Steeldogs.
 27 July 2014 - Elliot Dewey from Basingstoke Bison was confirmed as the second new signing for the Dynamos.
 4 August 2014 - Steve Osman, formerly of Wightlink Raiders was announced.
 6 August 2014 - Adam McNicoll, who had iced for the Dynamos early in the 2013/14 season, was announced as re-signing with the club.
 8 August 2014 - Harrison Lillis, who had spent the last part of the 2013/14 season at Streatham returned to the club.
 13 August 2014 - Billy Phillips was announced as joining the Dynamos from London.
 23 August 2014 - Charlie Phillips joined his brother in leaving London for the Dynamos.
 3 September 2014 - Former Peterborough Islanders goaltender, Steve Nightingale joined the team.
 18 September 2014 - Ex-Dynamo Grant Baxter rejoins the team after playing up from the Invicta Mustangs for a couple of games the previous season.
29 October 2014 - Frankie Harvey who previously played for London Raiders joined up with the team.

Out
 25 September 2014 - Chris Cooke leaves the club, subsequently signing for Wightlink Raiders.
 15 October 2014 - Greg Chambers leaves the club.

Players for 2014/15 season including stats
As of 26 November 2014

Fixtures and results

NIHL South Division 1

NIHL Southern Cup

English Challenge Cup

References

External links
Official website

Invicta Dynamos seasons
invicta